Club Sportiv Motorul Oradea was a Romanian women's football club from Oradea that played in the Liga I. They won three national championships in a row from 1996 to 1998. In October 2012 the club withdrew from the championship due to financial turmoil.

Honours

Titles
 Liga I (3)
 1996, 1997, 1998

Competition record

 Liga I 
 1st: 1996, 1997, 1998 — 3rd: 2002, 2005 — 4th: 2003, 2006, 2007, 2010 — 6th: 2008, 2011 — 7th: 2012 — 9th: 2009
 Cupa Rumaniei
 Semifinals: 2008 — Quarterfinals: 2005, 2010 — First Round: 2004

Former internationals
  Elena Pavel

References

Women's football clubs in Romania
Oradea
Sport in Oradea